Bemrose may refer to:

In people:
 Henry Howe Bemrose (1827 – 1911), a British printer and publisher, as well as mayor
 John Bemrose, a Canadian arts journalist, novelist, poet and playwright
 Max Bemrose (1904 – 1986), an English industrialist, politician
 Ted Bemrose, English footballer

In other uses:
 The Bemrose School, a school in Derby, England